Filignano is an Italian comune (municipality) of the Province of Isernia, in the region Molise.

History
The village was first mentioned in 962 and elevated to autonomous municipality in 1840, when it was separated from Pozzilli.

Geography
It is a hill town surrounded by the Mainarde mountain range, in the Abruzzo, Lazio and Molise National Park.

The municipal territory, bordering with the region of Lazio and not too far from Campania, borders with the municipalities of Acquafondata (FR), Colli a Volturno, Montaquila, Pozzilli, Rocchetta a Volturno, Scapoli, and Vallerotonda (FR). It counts the hamlets (frazioni) of Bottazzella, Cerasuolo, Cerreto, Collemacchia, Franchitti, Frunzo, Lagoni, Mastrogiovanni, Mennella, Selvone, Valerio, and Valle.

In the municipality there is a small community of Italian Scots, children and grandchildren of Filignanese immigrants, returning from Scotland.

People
Mario Lanza (1921-1959), Italian-American tenor and actor. Lanza's father was originally from Filignano. The town hosts a Mario Lanza festival every August.

References

External links

Official website  

Cities and towns in Molise